Fort de Loyasse is a fort built between 1836 and 1840. It is currently in the 9th arrondissement of Lyon and is part of the first belt of forts protecting Lyon.

The fort is a sister fort to Fort de Caluire and Fort Duchère (both since demolished) and Fort Saint-Jean.

History  

Built in 1836-1840 as a result of the July Revolution and resulting fears of an invasion of France by Austria, the fort of Loyasse was intended to protect the city from invaders from the east. This fort and the Fort de Vaise are located on the site of the former walled area of the Py.

The invention in 1858 of rifled bores replaced Smooth-bore rifles, and extended the reach of projectiles to 2,500m. Then melinite replaced gunpowder in 1885, which increased the blast of explosions, and forts of the Loyasse generation become obsolete.

The fort was used in World War I to house prisoners of war; during the Second World War it was occupied by the Germans. The fort was completely decommissioned by the military on October 15, 1947. Lyon acquired the land of the fort in 1949 at auction for 1,200,000 francs and used it as a roads department warehouse, a glacis, and allotment gardens still being cultivated today. The fort's underground galleries temporarily served as a mushroom farm.

A barracks of the fort was demolished in the 1960s to expand the montée de l'Observance, a city street; the trenchwork of the fort allowed construction of a boulevard linking the new district of l'Observance to the Vaise neighborhood in 1961.

Architecture 
Unlike many other forts of the first belt, Loyasse is designed as a mountain fort: the glacis around the fort are very inclined.

The fort consisted of two superimposed platforms along the slope:
 on the lower part, the working face is composed of three bastions   
 on the upper part, there are two bastions and a cavalier   
 between the two levels were two barracks, storerooms, wells, latrines and a gunpowder magazine . 
The functional range of the Fort de Loyasse smooth-bore guns was 1,200m.

Media 
The novel Le crime de Loyasse de Bernard Domeyne starts with the fictional story of  a body discovered in the fort.

A scene of the film Lucie Aubrac (1997) by Claude Berri has been linked to the fort de Loyasse.

See also
Ceintures de Lyon

References

Bibliography  
 
 

9th arrondissement of Lyon
Fortifications of Lyon
18th-century fortifications
18th-century architecture in France